A urinal is a plumbing fixture used for standing urination.

Urinal may also refer to:

 Urinal (health care), a small container to collect or measure urine of patients
 Urinal (film)
 Urinals (band)

See also
 
 Urinal deodorizer block, a small disinfectant block found in urinals